The Michelin Guides are a series of guide books that have been published by the French tyre company Michelin since 1900. The Guide awards up to three Michelin stars for excellence to a select few establishments. The acquisition or loss of a star or stars can have dramatic effects on the success of a restaurant. Michelin also publishes the Green Guides, a series of general guides to cities, regions, and countries.

History

In 1900, there were fewer than 3,000 cars on the roads of France. To increase the demand for cars and, accordingly, car tyres, car tyre manufacturers and brothers Édouard and André Michelin published a guide for French motorists, the Michelin Guide.  Nearly 35,000 copies of this first, free edition of the guide were distributed. It provided information to motorists, such as maps, tyre repair and replacement instructions, car mechanics listings, hotels, and petrol stations throughout France.

In 1904, the brothers published a guide for Belgium similar to the Michelin Guide. Michelin subsequently introduced guides for Algeria and Tunisia (1907); the Alps and the Rhine (northern Italy, Switzerland, Bavaria, and the Netherlands) (1908); Germany, Spain, and Portugal (1910); the British Isles (1911); and "The Countries of the Sun" (Northern Africa, Southern Italy and Corsica) (1911). In 1909, an English-language version of the guide to France was published.

During World War I, publication of the guide was suspended. After the war, revised editions of the guide continued to be given away until 1920. It is said that André Michelin, whilst visiting a tyre merchant, noticed copies of the guide being used to prop up a workbench. Based on the principle that "man only truly respects what he pays for", Michelin decided to charge a price for the guide, which was about 750 francs or $2.15 in 1922. They also made several changes, notably listing restaurants by specific categories, adding hotel listings (initially only for Paris), and removing advertisements in the guide. Recognizing the growing popularity of the restaurant section of the guide, the brothers recruited a team of inspectors to visit and review restaurants, who were always anonymous.

Following the usage of the Murray's and Baedeker guides, the guide began to award stars for fine dining establishments in 1926. Initially, there was only a single star awarded. Then, in 1931, the hierarchy of zero, one, two, and three stars was introduced. Finally, in 1936, the criteria for the starred rankings were published:

  : "A very good restaurant in its category"
  : "Excellent cooking, worth a detour"
  : "Exceptional cuisine, worth a special journey".

In 1931 the cover of the guide was changed from blue to red and has remained so in all subsequent editions. During World War II, publication was again suspended. In 1944, at the request of the Allied Forces, the 1939 guide to France was specially reprinted for military use; its maps were judged the best and most up-to-date available. Publication of the annual guide resumed on 16 May 1945, a week after VE Day.

In the early post-war years, the lingering effects of wartime shortages led Michelin to impose an upper limit of two stars; by 1950 the French edition listed 38 establishments judged to meet this standard. The first Michelin Guide to Italy was published in 1956. It awarded no stars in the first edition. In 1974, the first guide to Britain since 1931 was published. Twenty-five stars were awarded.

In 2005, Michelin published its first American guide, covering 500 restaurants in the five boroughs of New York City and 50 hotels in Manhattan. In 2007, a Tokyo Michelin Guide was launched. In the same year, the guide introduced a magazine, . In 2008, a Hong Kong and Macau volume was added. As of 2013, the guide is published in 14 editions covering 23 countries.

In 2008, German restaurateur Juliane Caspar was appointed editor-in-chief of the French edition of the guide. She had previously been responsible for the Michelin guides to Germany, Switzerland, and Austria. She became the first woman and first non-French national to occupy the French position. The German newspaper  commented on the appointment, "In view of the fact German cuisine is regarded as a lethal weapon in most parts of France, this decision is like Mercedes announcing that its new director of product development is a Martian."

The guide announced its first list of restaurants in the state of Florida on 9 June 2022, after striking a deal the year prior with tourism boards in the state. The guide gave out a single two-star ranking and fourteen one-star rankings, as well as 29 Bib Gourmands.

Methods and layout

Red Guides have historically listed many more restaurants than rival guides, relying on an extensive system of symbols to describe each one in as little as two lines. Reviews of starred restaurants also include two to three culinary specialties. Short summaries (2–3 lines) were added in 2002/2003 to enhance descriptions of many establishments. These summaries are written in the language of the country for which the guide is published (though the Spain and Portugal volume is in Spanish only) but the symbols are the same throughout all editions.

Stars

Michelin reviewers (commonly called "inspectors") are anonymous; they do not identify themselves, and their meals and expenses are paid for by Michelin, never by a restaurant being reviewed:

In France, when the guide is published each year, it sparks a media frenzy which has been compared to that for annual Academy Awards for films. Media and others debate likely winners, speculation is rife, and TV and newspapers discuss which restaurant might lose and which might gain a Michelin star.

The Michelin Guide also awards "Rising Stars", an indication that a restaurant has the potential to qualify for a star, or an additional star.

Green stars
In 2020, the Michelin Guide launched a sustainability emblem to symbolise excellence in sustainable gastronomy. An establishment awarded this green star is given space on the Guide's website for the chef to describe the restaurant's vision.

Bib Gourmand
Since 1955, the guide has also highlighted restaurants offering "exceptionally good food at moderate prices", a feature now called "". They must offer menu items priced below a maximum determined by local economic standards.  is the company's nickname for the Michelin Man, its corporate logo for over a century.

The Plate
In 2016, a new symbol, the Plate, was added to recognise restaurants that "simply serve good food".

Guides

For each country/combination of countries

Regions and cities

Non-restaurant food
In 2014, Michelin introduced a separate listing for gastropubs in Ireland. In 2016, the Michelin Guide for Hong Kong and Macau introduced an overview of notable street-food establishments. In the same year, the Singapore guide introduced the first Michelin stars for street-food locations, for Hong Kong Soya Sauce Chicken Rice and Noodle and Hill Street Tai Hwa Pork Noodle.

Other ratings

All listed restaurants, regardless of their star, or Plate status, also receive a "fork and spoon" designation, as a subjective reflection of the overall comfort and quality of the restaurant. Rankings range from one to five: one fork and spoon represents a "comfortable restaurant" and five signifies a "luxurious restaurant". 
Forks and spoons colored red designate a restaurant that is considered "pleasant" as well.

Restaurants, independently of their other ratings in the guide, can also receive a number of other symbols next to their listing:

 Coins indicate restaurants that serve a menu for a certain price or less, depending on the local monetary standard. In 2010 France, 2011 US and Japan Red Guides, the maximum permitted "coin" prices were €19, $25, and ¥5000, respectively.
 Interesting view or Magnificent view, designated by a black or red symbol, are given to restaurants offering those features.
 Grapes, a sake set, or a cocktail glass indicate restaurants that offer, at minimum, a "somewhat interesting" selection of wines, sake, or cocktails, respectively.

Green Guides
The Michelin Green Guides review and rate attractions other than restaurants. There is a Green Guide for France as a whole, and a more detailed one for each of ten regions within France. Other Green Guides cover many countries, regions, and cities outside France. Many Green Guides are published in several languages. They include background information and an alphabetical section describing points of interest. Like the Red Guides, they use a three-star system for recommending sites, ranging from "worth a trip" to "worth a detour", and "interesting".

Controversies

Allegations of lax inspection standards and bias
Pascal Rémy, a veteran France-based Michelin inspector, and also a former Gault Millau employee, wrote a tell-all book, L'Inspecteur se met à table (The Inspector Sits Down at the Table, published in 2004. Rémy's employment was terminated in December 2003 when he informed Michelin of his plans to publish his book. He brought a court case for unfair dismissal, which was unsuccessful.

Rémy described the French Michelin inspector's life as lonely, underpaid drudgery, driving around France for weeks on end, dining alone, under intense pressure to file detailed reports on strict deadlines. He maintained that the guide had become lax in its standards. Though Michelin states that its inspectors visited all 4,000 reviewed restaurants in France every 18 months, and all starred restaurants several times a year, Rémy said only about one visit every  years was possible because there were only 11 inspectors in France when he was hired, rather than the 50 or more hinted by Michelin. That number, he said, had shrunk to five by the time he was fired in December 2003.

Rémy also accused the guide of favouritism. He alleged that Michelin treated famous and influential chefs, such as Paul Bocuse and Alain Ducasse, as "untouchable" and not subject to the same rigorous standards as lesser-known chefs.  Michelin denied Rémy's charges, but refused to say how many inspectors it actually employed in France. In response to Rémy's statement that certain three-star chefs were sacrosanct, Michelin said, "There would be little sense in saying a restaurant was worth three stars if it weren't true, if for no other reason than that the customer would write and tell us."

Allegations of prejudice favouring French cuisine
Some non-French food critics have alleged that the rating system is biased in favour of French cuisine or French dining standards. The UK The Guardian commented in 1997 that "some people maintain the guide's principal purpose is as a tool of Gallic cultural imperialism".  When Michelin published its first New York City Red Guide in 2005 Steven Kurutz of The New York Times noted that Danny Meyer's Union Square Cafe, a restaurant rated highly by The New York Times, Zagat Survey, and other prominent guides, received a no-star rating from Michelin (he did, however, acknowledge that the restaurant received positive mention for its ambiance, and that two other restaurants owned by Meyer received stars). Kurutz also said the guide appeared to favour restaurants that "emphasized formality and presentation" rather than a "casual approach to fine dining". He said over half of the restaurants that received one or two stars "could be considered French". The Michelin Guide New York 2007 included 526 restaurants, compared to 2,014 in Zagat New York 2007; after The Four Seasons Restaurant received no stars in that edition, co-owner Julian Niccolini said Michelin "should stay in France, and they should keep their guide there". The 2007 guide does, however, include menus, recipes, and photographs, and descriptions of the atmosphere of starred restaurants.

Allegations of leniency with stars for Japanese cuisine
In 2007 Tokyo's restaurants were awarded with the most stars and in 2010 other Japanese cities like Kyoto and Osaka also received many stars. At the time this sparked questions from some over whether these high ratings were merited for Japanese restaurants, or whether the Michelin guide was too generous in giving out stars to gain an acceptance with Japanese customers and to enable the tyre-selling parent company to market itself in Japan. But the discrepancy is easily explained by the number of restaurants in total: Tokyo has 160,000 restaurants while Paris, for example, has just 40,000. The Wall Street Journal reported in 2010 that some Japanese chefs were surprised at receiving a star and were reluctant to accept one because the publicity caused an unmanageable jump in booking, affecting their ability to serve their traditional customers without lowering their quality.

Unwanted stars
Some restaurateurs have asked Michelin to revoke a star, because they felt that it created undesirable customer expectations or pressure to spend more on service and decor. Notable cases include:
  (Spain): After receiving a star for a perfumed cuisine in 2009, the restaurant chef Julio Biosca felt the award was granted to dishes that he did not like and which restricted his creativity. He tried to remove his star, and in December 2013 he discontinued his tasting menu. The removal took place in the 2015 guide.
 Petersham Nurseries Café (London): After receiving a star in 2011, founder and chef Skye Gyngell received complaints from customers expecting formal dining, leading to her attempt to remove the star, and her subsequent retirement from the restaurant. She has since said she regrets her remarks and would welcome a star.
 't Huis van Lede (Belgium): After receiving a star in 2014, chef Frederick Dhooge said he did not want his Michelin star or his points in the Gault-Millau restaurant guide because some customers were not interested in simple food from a Michelin-starred restaurant.

Mistakes
 In 2017, the Bouche à Oreille café in Bourges was accidentally given a star when it was confused with a restaurant of the same name in Boutervilliers, near Paris.

See also 

 List of female chefs with Michelin stars
The World's 50 Best Restaurants

Notes

References

Further reading

Published in the 20th century
  (+ List of excursions)

Published in the 21st century
Follows the 60-odd chefs who have been awarded three stars.
 The Perfectionist: Life and Death in Haute Cuisine, by Rudolph Chelminski, 2006. . The story of Bernard Loiseau.
 From behind the wall: Danish Newspaper Berlingske Employee 'Awards'

External links

 
 Vía Michelin
 Michelin Travel Guides
 Ogushi's 3 Stars Restaurants List of France (Past & Now)

 
Michelin brands
Consumer guides
Food and drink awards
Hotel guide books
Publications established in 1900
Restaurant guides
Travel guide books